Mapes may refer to:

People
 Bruce Mapes (1901–1961), American figure skater
 Carl E. Mapes (1874–1939), American politician
 Charlie Mapes (born 1982), English former footballer
 Cliff Mapes (1922–1996), American baseball player
 David P. Mapes (1798–1890), American businessman and politician
 Elias Mapes (1833–1906), American union organizer and politician
 Erwin Kempton Mapes (1884–1961), American scholar of Spanish-American literature
 Elizabeth Bonhôte (1744–1818), née Mapes, English novelist and essayist
 J. A. Mapes (1861–1942), American politician
 James Mapes (1806–1866), American chemist
 Mary Mapes (born 1956), American journalist and television news producer
 Mary Mapes Dodge (1831–1905), née Mapes, American children's writer
 Ted Mapes (1901–1984), American stuntman

Fictional characters
 Shadout Mapes, in the novel Dune and its movie adaptations

Other uses
 Mapes, British Columbia, Canada, a settlement
 Mapes Hotel, a demolished hotel/casino in Reno, Nevada, United States
 Mapes Creek, Seattle, Washington, United States
 Toe loop jump, sometimes called "Mapes" after its inventor, Bruce Mapes

See also
 Mape (disambiguation)
 Milton Mapes, an American country band